The Sussex Cricket Board is the former governing body for all recreational cricket in the historic county of Sussex.  On 1 November 2015, the Sussex Cricket Board (SCB) merged with Sussex County Cricket Club (SCCC) to form a single governing body for cricket in Sussex, called Sussex Cricket Limited (SCL).

From 1999 to 2003 the Board fielded a team in the English domestic one-day tournament, matches which had List-A status.

See also
List of Sussex Cricket Board List A players

References

External links
 Sussex Cricket Board

County Cricket Boards
Cricket in Sussex